After 23 games the league table is frozen and the teams are split up into 2 of the 3 "Super 8's". Teams finishing in the top 8 will go on to contest "Super League" and will all retain a place in the competition for the next season, as they go on to play 7 more games each, as they compete for a place in the Grand Final. Teams finishing in the bottom four (9-12) will be put alongside the top 4 teams from the  Championship, in "The Qualifiers" Super 8 group. Where these teams will reset their season standings to 0 and also play 7 extra games each, as they attempt to earn a place in the following Super League competition.

Super League
 
The Super League Super 8s sees the top 8 teams from the Super League play 7 games each. Each team's points are carried over and after 7 additional games the top 4 teams will contest the play off semi-finals with the team in 1st hosting the team in 4th, and the team finishing 2nd hosting the 3rd placed team; the winners of these semi-finals will contest the Super League Grand Final at Old Trafford. 
Teams finishing 5th, 6th, 7th and 8th after the 7 additional games will take no further part in the 2015 season but will play in Super League again in 2016.

Round 1

Round 2

Round 3

Round 4

Round 5

Round 6

Round 7

Standings

(Q)= Qualified for playoffs
(F)= Failed to qualify for Playoff

Play-offs

The Qualifiers

The Qualifiers Super 8s sees the bottom 4 teams from Super League table join the top 4 teams from the Championship. The points totals are reset to 0 and each team plays 7 games each, playing every other team once. After 7 games each the teams finishing 1st, 2nd, and 3rd will gain qualification to the 2016 Super League season. The teams finishing 4th and 5th will play in the "Million Pound Game" at the home of the 4th place team which will earn the winner a place in the 2016 Super League; the loser, along with teams finishing 6th, 7th and 8th, will be relegated to the Championship.

Round 1

Round 2

Round 3

Round 4

Round 5

Round 6

Round 7

Standings

(Q) = Qualified for Super League XXI 
(S) = Secured spot in one off play-off game for Super League XXI 
(R) = Relegated to the Championship for 2016

Million Pound Game

Championship Shield

The third of the three "Super 8" groups sees teams finishing 5th to 12th in the regular Championship table. Like the Super League 8s, these teams retain their original points and play 7 extra games, with the teams finishing in the top 4 places after these extra games contesting play-offs similar to Super League, with 1st v 4th and 2nd vs 3rd, with the winners contesting the Championship Shield Grand Final.

The two teams finishing at the bottom of this Super 8s group (7th and 8th) will be relegated to League One and be replaced by two promoted sides.

See also

References

Super League
Rugby Football League Championship
2015 in English rugby league